Yury Isakov (30 December 1949 – 29 September 2013) was a Soviet athlete. He competed in the men's pole vault at the 1976 Summer Olympics.

References

1949 births
2013 deaths
Athletes (track and field) at the 1976 Summer Olympics
Soviet male pole vaulters
Olympic athletes of the Soviet Union
Place of birth missing
Universiade silver medalists for the Soviet Union
Universiade medalists in athletics (track and field)